The Ministry of Citizenship (Portuguese: Ministério da Cidadania), created by the fusion of the Ministry of Social and Agrarian Development (Portuguese: Ministério do Desenvolvimento Social e Agrário), Ministry of Culture and Ministry of Sports, is a cabinet-level federal ministry in Brazil. The current Minister of citizenship is Ronaldo Bento.

References

External links
 Official Website of the Citizenship Ministry of Brazil

Government ministries of Brazil
Ministries established in 2004
2004 establishments in Brazil